Nørrebrogade is the principal shopping street of the Nørrebro district of Copenhagen, Denmark. It runs from The Lakes in the southeast to Nørrebro station in the northwest, linking Frederiksborggade and Queen Louise's Bridge with Frederikssundsvej. The street passes Assistens Cemetery, Nørrebro Runddel and the Superkilen linear park. Buildings include the multipurpose venue Nørrebrohallen and two churches.

History
Nørrebrogade originates in the road that led in and out of Copenhagen's Northern City Gate. Few buildings were located along the road due to the so-called Demarcation Line enforced restrictions on the construction of buildings outside Copenhagen's fortifications. The road was built over after the demarcation line was moved to the lakes in 1952.

Notable buildings and residents
 
Alderstrøst (No. 9) was built by Håndværkerforeningen in 1860 - 1862 to provide affordable housing for old craftsmen. The Neoclassical building was designed by Theodor Sørensen. It was later followed by another housing complex by the same name on Nørre Allé.

The Sacrament Church (No. 27), located as a point de vue opposite Fælledvej, is a Roman Catholic church. It was consecrated in 1917.

Rud. Rasmussen's furniture workshop (No. 45) was established at the site in the 1870s and is still active in the manufacturing of many Danish furniture classics. The complex consists of a residential building on Nørrebrogade from 1895, a factory building facing Stengade from 1876 and a factory building with Mansard roof from 1911 designed by Alfred Thomsen in the courtyard. The complex was declared a Danish Industrial Heritage Site in 2007 and was listed in 2008.

The Gracedigger's House (No. 67) was built in 1805 by Jens Bang. The building was listed in 1959. KEA – Copenhagen School of Design and Technology's Empire Campus (No. 66), which is located opposite the cemetery, was established in 2011–2013. It is partly based in a complex of old, industrial buildings which were adapted for their current use by Bertelsen & Scheving Arkitekter.

The apartment building Uranienborg (No. 168) is from 1902 and was designed by Anton Rosen. The Functionalist Zøllnerhus (No. 174-176) is from 1934-1936 and was designed by Charles I. Schou and Erik Kragh. It was listed in 2006.

Completed in 1874 to design by Ludvig Knudsen, St. Stephen's Church (Mo. 191) was the second church N'rrebro. No. 198 is the former  headquarters of the Danish, machine factory and iron foundry Atlas. The building was designed by Alfred Thomsen. A painted advertisement for Atlas refrigerators is still seen on the gable of No. 200.

Nørrebrohallen (No. 208) is a former carriage house which is now used as a multi-purpose venue.

Public art
A gable facing Ravnsborggade features a large mural of a girl on a bicycle. It was painted by the Finnish-Danish painter Seppo Matinens in the 1990s.

Om the wall to Assistens Cemetery is Jørgen Haugen Sørensen's sculpture The Angular Ones support, and the Smooth Ones Slip from 1984. On Aksel Larsens Plads stands Bjørn Nørgaard's sculpture A Farewell To Arms from 2009.

Transport
Nørrebro station at the north end of the street is located on the S-train system's Ring Line. It is also home to one of the stations on the operated City Circle Line of the Copenhagen Metro. Another City Circle Line station is located at Nørrebro Runddel.

Bus line 5C runs through the street.

References

External links

Shopping streets in Copenhagen
Streets in Nørrebro